Toivo was a frigate built in 1871 at the Toppila shipyard in Oulu, Finland (then a part of the Russian Empire) for Tradehouse J. W. Snellman. Toivo was re-rigged  as a bark in 1880. She sailed for Tradehouse J. W. Snellman until 1888, when she was sold to Eriksen & Gjersöe, Sweden-Norway. The ship is believed to have been taken out of service in 1895.

Actions of the Toivos first captain Henrik Wilhelm Snellman Junior are the subject of the Finnish folk protest song "Laiva Toivo, Oulu", set to the melody of "Marching Through Georgia". The lyrics of the song, which paint H. W. Snellman in an unsymphatetic light, were probably written by Jaakko Haataja, who was the second mate of the Toivo on her third voyage from Europe to East Asia in 1874–1875.

Footnotes

References

 
 

1871 ships
History of Oulu
Ships built in Finland
Barques
Tall ships of Finland
Tall ships of Norway
Merchant ships of Finland
Merchant ships of Norway